The Roaring Fork Transportation Authority (RFTA; pronounced ) is an agency that operates public transportation for the Roaring Fork Valley in Colorado.  RFTA's service area stretches  from Aspen to Rifle, serving major cities of Basalt, Snowmass Village, Carbondale, and Glenwood Springs in between. RFTA also operates seasonal ski shuttles, guided bus tours to Maroon Bells, paratransit, and manages the Rio Grande Trail.

RFTA is the second largest transit provider in Colorado (after Denver) and the largest rural transit provider in the United States. In September 2013, RFTA became the first rural transit provider to construct and operate bus rapid transit in the United States.

History
Transportation in the Roaring Fork Valley dates back to the late-1880s, when the Denver and Rio Grande Railroad ran their first train to Glenwood Springs on October 5, 1887. The railroad continued extending their line upvalley to Aspen, completing the Aspen Branch on October 27, 1887. Denver and Rio Grande's competitor, Colorado Midland Railway, reached Aspen the same year, and completed their connection downvalley to Glenwood Springs on December 9, 1887. The Colorado Midland Railway's route was later converted to Colorado State Highway 82 (SH 82). In 1890, Aspen's economy boomed after the passing of the Sherman Silver Purchase Act, becoming the largest silver producer in the United States. In June, the Aspen City Railway opened a  narrow gauge horsecar line that zigzagged through the city. The system was the smallest in the state, owning only two cars and five horses. The repeal of the Sherman Silver Purchase Act in 1983, Aspen's economy collapsed, and it is assumed operations were abandoned sometime afterwards. Due to early abandonment, the Aspen City Railway never converted to electric streetcars as was common during that time.

RFTA's origins dates back to the mid-1970s when the City of Aspen and Piktin County implemented separate free transit services for the area, Aspen Free Shuttle and Pitkin County Bus, respectively. Aspen Free Shuttle operated fixed routes within the city and to Aspen Skiing Company mountains, while Pitkin County bus operated on the SH 82 corridor to El Jebel.  In 1983 the Roaring Fork Transit Agency (RFTA) was formed by merging the two systems, funded by a 1¢ sales tax. Service was extended to Carbondale in 1989. From 1984 to 1989, yearly ridership increased 36% from 1.4 million to 1.8 million.

Between 1990 and 1995, RFTA experienced incredible growth of 85% from 1.9 million to 3.5 million annual rides. Ridership increases were contributed to service extension to Glenwood Springs, a free downtown circulator in Glenwood Springs, frequency increases, and the introduction of paid parking in Aspen. Also during this time period, the Environmental Protection Agency designated Aspen as a PM non-attainment area, resulting in RFTA increasing services to reduce air pollution and vehicle miles traveled, particularly along the SH 82 corridor.

In 1994 the Roaring Fork Railroad Holding Authority (RFRHA) was created as a public entity to purchase the former Denver and Rio Grande Aspen Branch between Glenwood Springs and Woody Creek. The corridor was purchased in 1996 at a cost of $8.5 million. The corridor was converted to a rail trail and railbanked for a future mass transit line to reduce congestion on SH 82. In 2000, the Roaring Fork Transportation Authority was created by seven members in the Roaring Fork Valley, creating the state's first Rural Transportation Agency and taking over the responsibilities of the Roaring Fork Transit Agency. As a result of the vote, RFRHA merged with the RFTA in 2001.

In 2004 the Town of New Castle voted to become the newest member of RFTA. Rifle and Silt, west of New Castle along the I-70/US 6 corridor, are not members but still receive RFTA service on the Grand Hogback route.

Service was temporarily extended to Parachute during a 95-day replacement of the Grand Avenue bridge in Glenwood Springs from August 14 to November 22, 2017. It's estimated that the free service resulted in an additional 300,000 annual rides during 2017. The Town of Parachute began negotiations with RFTA to extend service there, but was shelved for being too expensive. In September 2020, Parachute Area Transit System (PATS) began service to Battlement Mesa and Rifle, connecting with RFTA at the latter. While RFTA does not operate the service, they assisted in developing routes, fares, and schedules.

Fleet

As of June 2020, RFTA operates a fleet of 136 transit buses and 10 cutaway vans, nine of which are used for paratransit service. All buses are fully accessible and use alternative fuels to enhance environmental sustainability in the Valley. All diesel buses use biodiesel and all gasoline-powered cutaway and service vehicles use ethanol. Twenty-two compressed natural gas (CNG) buses with free on-board Wi-Fi were introduced with the VelociRFTA bus rapid transit line. On December 3, 2019, the first of eight battery electric buses were placed into service on City of Aspen routes at the cost of $9.2 million. It is the beginning of an initiative to convert 30% of RFTA's bus fleet to electric over the next 20 years. CNG buses operate out of the Glenwood Springs Maintenance Facility and battery electric buses operate out of the Aspen Maintenance Facility.

Beginning in the late 1970s, RFTA's predecessors were one of the first transit agencies in the United States to allow buses to carry bikes using custom built bike racks. All buses are equipped with bike racks from mid-spring to late-fall. Racks on most buses are capable of hauling four bikes at a time, although racks on VelociRFTA buses are only capable of carrying two bikes. During winter ski season, the bike racks are removed and replaced with ski racks. Bikes are not allowed on buses after nightfall due to driver visibility issues.

VelociRFTA

RFTA's system offers express service throughout the Roaring Fork Valley from Glenwood Springs to Aspen since September 3, 2013. VelociRFTA is thought to be the first ever rural Bus Rapid Transit system in the U.S. Ridership immediately rose 27.6% year over year with the new system.  These buses operate on CNG from the Glenwood Springs facility.

The name is a pun on Velociraptor and the logo is a green Velociraptor. To promote the new service, RFTA placed giant concrete and foam eggs at selected bus stops, and cast dinosaur footprints in nearby sidewalks.

Route list
Valley Routes:
VelociRFTA - Express service from Glenwood Springs to Aspen with limited stops and travel time of one hour. 
Roaring Fork Valley- Intercity service from Aspen to Glenwood Springs and the town in between.
Grand Hogback- Intercity service from Glenwood Springs to Rifle. This route has been extended west to Parachute while the Grand Avenue Bridge in Glenwood Springs is under construction.

City of Aspen, Snowmass Village, Carbondale and Glenwood Springs Routes:
Burlingame- Free City of Aspen service from Rubey Park Transit Center to the Burlingame Ranch housing development via Highway 82 among all stops along Highway 82
Castle Maroon- Free City of Aspen service with access to West Main Street, Aspen Valley Hospital, the Aspen Chapel, The Senior Services Building, Aspen District Schools Campus, the James E. Moore Pool, and Aspen Highlands Ski Area. This route may also be used to access seasonal bus service to the popular Maroon Bells viewing site. RTFA operates the Maroon Bells shuttle under contract to the United States Forest Service.
Cemetery Lane- Free City of Aspen service with access to Cemetery Lane, West Main Street and the Rio Grande Trail.
Hunter Creek- Free City of Aspen service with access to the Post Office, Clark's Market, the Rio Grande Trail, Hunter Creek and Centennial Condos, City Market and the Silver Queen Gondola.
Mt Valley/Dial-a-Ride: Free City of Aspen service includes the residential areas in Mountain Valley, north of Highway 82
Galena Street Shuttle- Free seasonal Aspen City downtown circulator
Woody Creek- Seasonal Aspen City service between Aspen and Woody Creek
Four Mountain Connector- Winter seasonal intercity ski service
Highlands- Aspen seasonal ski shuttle
Snowmass- Free service between Aspen and Snowmass Village
Carbondale Circulator: Circualtor service within the town of Carbondale, from the Carbondale Park & Ride to downtown Main Street

Fares
RFTA uses fare zones to determine fares based on the length of a trip. Ticket vending machines at all 9 bus rapid transit stations Stored value cards, seasonal and 30 day zone passes are available from ticket vending machines at all 9 VelociRFTA stations and select retail outlets and offer a 26% discount. Discount fares are also available for veterans and persons with disabilities. Children under 5 and seniors 65 and over ride for free.

Service is free within and between Aspen, Snowmass Village, and Woody Creek, partially subsidized by the Elected Officials Transportation Committee. No-fare service is also offered on the Carbondale Circulator.

Because of the COVID-19 pandemic, fares were not being collected on RFTA buses until August 1, 2020. Cash is not being accepted on buses and riders are required to pay beforehand.

Awards
RFTA has received numerous awards for its service:
Best Large Transit Agency of the Year (2003, 2006, 2009, 2012, 2018) -  Colorado Association of Transit Agencies
Innovation Award (2008) - Colorado Association of Transit Agencies
Marketing Program of the Year (2003, 2009, 2013) - Colorado Association of Transit Agencies
Outstanding Community Tourism Initiative Award (2008) - Colorado Governor's Tourism Conference
Outstanding Public Service Award (2014) - Federal Transit Administrator
Distinguished Budget Presentation Award (2007-2012) - Government Finance Officers Association
Best Mass Transit System of North America (1996) - Mass Transit Magazine
Sustainability Award (2014) - SHIFT
Transportation Innovator Award (2012) - White House Champions of Change

References

External links
 RFTA Official Website

Bus transportation in Colorado
Government agencies established in 1983
Transportation in Eagle County, Colorado
Transportation in Pitkin County, Colorado
Transit agencies in Colorado